Alwyn Uytingco (born February 11, 1988, in Quezon City) is a Filipino actor.

Early life 

Cipriano Alwyn Sumulong Uytingco III was born on February 11, 1988, in Quezon City, Manila, Philippines. He was educated at the Marist School (Marikina).

Career 
In 2003, Uytingco appeared as Pip in the film Ang Tanging Ina. In 2013, Uytingco was cast in the TV show Cassandra: Warrior Angel. A year later, he was cast as the titular boxer in Beki Boxer. In 2018, Uytingco appeared in the film Asuang and won the Best Actor award in the Cinema One Originals Digital Film Festival.

Personal life 

Uytingco is married to actress Jennica Garcia, the couple married on February 12, 2014, together they have two children. They separated in 2021.

Filmography

Television

Film

Awards and nominations

References

External links

1988 births
Living people
Filipino male film actors
Filipino male television actors
Star Magic